Associazione Sportiva Dilettantistica Città di Varese, or simply Città di Varese or Varese, is a football club based in Varese, Lombardy, Italy. The club was founded in 2019 by three fans, following the dissolution of Varese Calcio, and have won the Terza Categoria in their debut season. In 2020 Città di Varese merged with Busto 81, and gained the right to play in the 2020–21 Serie D Group A.

History
The club was established by three football fans from Varese – Stefano Pertile, Stefano Amirante and Cesare Bonazzi –  on 26 July 2019, with the purpose to "keep alive" Varese's name in the Italian football league system, following the dissolution of Varese Calcio. As a matter of fact, Città di Varese adopted the historic colours of the football club founded in 1910 (red and white), but never openly claimed any inheritance of the ceased team.

In its maiden season, coached by Stefano Iori, Città di Varese won the 2019–20 Terza Categoria Varese Group B, the lowest tier of the Italian football pyramid. On 16 July 2020, prior to the 2020–21 season, the club merged with Busto 81 (a club based in Busto Arsizio, no longer interested in pursuing the football activity) and obtained the right to participate in the Serie D Group A, Italy's fourth division.

Players

Current squad

Honours
 Terza Categoria Varese (Level 9)
 Winners (1): 2019–20 (Group B)

References

External links
  

 
Football clubs in Lombardy
Sport in Varese
Association football clubs established in 2019
2019 establishments in Italy
Serie D clubs